Bréiner Stiven Belalcázar Ulabarry (born 23 September 1984), known as Bréiner Belalcázar, is a Colombian retired footballer.

Club career
Belalcázar previously played for Deportivo Cali and has spent time on loan at Deportes Quindío, La Equidad, and Atlético Huila.

In January 2011, he returned to Deportivo Cali.

Notes

External links
 
 
 Bréiner Belalcázar at ESPN Deportes 
 

1984 births
Living people
Colombian footballers
Deportivo Cali footballers
Deportes Quindío footballers
La Equidad footballers
Atlético Huila footballers
Atlético Junior footballers
Deportes Tolima footballers
Alianza Petrolera players
Águilas Doradas Rionegro players
Deportivo Pasto footballers
Deportivo Pereira footballers
Categoría Primera A players
Association football midfielders
Sportspeople from Valle del Cauca Department